Jonas Björkman and Todd Woodbridge successfully defended their title for a third year, defeating Julian Knowle and Nenad Zimonjić in the final, 6–1, 6–4, 4–6, 6–4, to win the gentlemen's doubles title at the 2004 Wimbledon Championships With the title Woodbridge broke Laurence and Reginald Doherty's record of eight Wimbledon men's doubles titles.

Seeds

  Jonas Björkman /  Todd Woodbridge (champions)
  Bob Bryan /  Mike Bryan (third round)
  Mahesh Bhupathi /  Max Mirnyi (third round)
  Michaël Llodra /  Fabrice Santoro (withdrew)
  Mark Knowles /  Daniel Nestor (semifinals)
  Wayne Black /  Kevin Ullyett (quarterfinals)
  Wayne Arthurs /  Paul Hanley (semifinals)
  Martin Damm /  Cyril Suk (third round)
  Gastón Etlis /  Martín Rodríguez (second round)
  Jonathan Erlich /  Andy Ram (first round)
  Leander Paes /  David Rikl (second round)
  Jared Palmer /  Pavel Vízner (third round)
  František Čermák /  Leoš Friedl (first round)
  Xavier Malisse /  Olivier Rochus (second round, retired)
  Mariano Hood /  Sebastián Prieto (second round)
  Julian Knowle /  Nenad Zimonjić (final)

Qualifying

Draw

Finals

Top half

Section 1

Section 2

Bottom half

Section 3

Section 4

References

External links

2004 Wimbledon Championships – Men's draws and results at the International Tennis Federation

Men's Doubles
Wimbledon Championship by year – Men's doubles